Patrick F. Kelly (June 25, 1929 – November 16, 2007) was a United States district judge of the United States District Court for the District of Kansas.

Education and career

Born in Wichita, Kansas, Kelly received a Bachelor of Arts degree from Wichita State University in 1951 and a Bachelor of Laws from Washburn University School of Law in 1953. He was in the United States Air Force from 1953 to 1955. He was in private practice in Wichita from 1955 to 1980.

Federal judicial service

On April 14, 1980, Kelly was nominated by President Jimmy Carter to a seat on the United States District Court for the District of Kansas vacated by Judge Wesley E. Brown. Kelly was confirmed by the United States Senate on May 21, 1980, and received his commission on May 23, 1980. He served as Chief Judge from 1992 to 1995, assuming senior status on June 6, 1995. Kelly served in that capacity until his retirement from the bench, on March 15, 1996. He died on November 16, 2007, in Wichita.

References

Sources
 
 

1929 births
2007 deaths
People from Wichita, Kansas
Wichita State University alumni
Washburn University alumni
Judges of the United States District Court for the District of Kansas
United States district court judges appointed by Jimmy Carter
20th-century American judges
United States Air Force officers